PASOK Youth (translit. Neolaia PASOK) is the youth organization of the Panhellenic Socialist Movement (PASOK) party of Greece.

The parent party's ideology is social democracy.

External links 
 Official homepage of Neolaia PASOK

References

Youth wings of political parties in Greece
Youth wings of social democratic parties
PASOK